The Birnam Oak is an example of Sessile oak (Quercus petraea) at Birnam, Perth and Kinross, Scotland. Sometimes known as Macbeth's oak, as it is a relic of Birnam Wood, mentioned in William Shakespeare's play, the tree is found in a strip of woodland on the south bank of the River Tay. The exact age is unknown, but the girth suggests an age of around 600 years old which would mean it was already a mature tree at the time of Shakespeare's presumed visit to Perthshire in 1589. The tree is listed by Forestry and Land Scotland as one of Scotland's most famous oak trees.

References

Individual oak trees
Tourist attractions in Perth and Kinross
Macbeth
Individual trees in Scotland